List of published works of Peter Schjeldahl, American poet and art critic.

Books

Exhibition catalogs 
 
 
 
  Exhibition held November 18, 1984 to January 6, 1985.
  Exhibition at the Whitney Museum of American Art, July 9 to October 4, 1987.
 
 
  Exhibition of the work of Jackie Winsor at the Milwaukee Art Museum, November 22, 1991 to January 19, 1992.
 
  Exhibition held at the Museo de Monterrey, October 14, 1993 – January 2, 1994.
 
  Exhibition held at the Kestner-Gesellschaft Hannover, Nov. 26, 1994-Jan. 22, 1995
  Exhibition at Art Gallery of Ontario, Toronto, 28 February-25 May 1997.
  Catalog of an exhibition held at C & M Arts, New York, April 2-May 28, 1998.
  Catalog of an exhibition held at Contemporary Arts Museum, Houston, Dec. 8, 2001-Feb. 17, 2002.

Essays, reporting and other contributions 
 
 
 
 
 
 
 
 
 
 
 
 
 
  Georges Braque at the Acquavella Galleries.
 
  Reviews 
  'Richard Artschwager!', a retrospective at the Whitney Museum of American Art.
 
 
  Surrealism exhibition at the Morgan Library.
 
 
 
  Elizabeth Peyton.
 
  Retrospective of Jane Freilicher at the Tibor de Nagy gallery.
 
 
  Kenneth Price retrospective at the Metropolitan Museum of Art.

Notes 

Bibliographies by writer
Bibliographies of American writers